Shankargarh  is one of the administrative blocks of Balrampur district, Chhattisgarh state, India.
 
It is located 60 km north east of Ambikapur. 
 

Community development blocks in Balrampur district, Chhattisgarh
Community development blocks in Chhattisgarh
Cities and towns in Balrampur district, Chhattisgarh